Sumter Mall is a 43-acre shopping mall located in Sumter, South Carolina. The anchors are Belk, Roses, and Sykes.

The first use of the name "Sumter Mall" was for a 20-acre downtown mall that became known as Sumter Towne Mall.  Construction of this mall was announced by Plaza Associates Inc. in 1973. Completed in 1975 and defunct by 1982, this mall has also been known as the Sumter Downtown Mall and the Downtown Sumter Mall.

In 1979, the mall was announced by Jim Wilson with Belk and JCPenney as anchors. The mall cost $12.5 million to build and was named Jessamine Mall, sometimes referred to as Jasmine Mall,  after the state flower of South Carolina. The mall opened on August 6, 1980. On August 21, 1980, business was announced to be excellent at the mall with people traveling from surrounding areas to shop there. In 1989 a 53,000 square foot Sears was announced for the mall.

In 2000, the mall was sold to Hull Storey Gibson who cited Sumter's position as the retail and financial center of the surrounding area as the reason for purchasing the mall. In 2002, the mall was renovated and renamed Sumter Mall. In 2003, the mall had its grand opening under its new name. The mall is one of the counties largest taxpayers paying $1.3 million annually. The mall is fully enclosed and employs approximately 850 people. The mall's size was originally reported as being 431,617 square feet, but was later reported as 345,000 square feet.

In 2009, a Sykes Enterprises call center was announced for Sumter Mall. The call center opened on September 29, 2010 with attendance from Governor Mark Sanford.

In 2011, a Books-A-Million was announced for the mall, which has since been built.

On December 17, 2020, it was announced that JCPenney would be closing in March 2021 as part of a plan to close 15 stores nationwide.

References

Further reading

External links

Sumter, South Carolina
Shopping malls in South Carolina
Shopping malls established in 1975
Hull Property Group